Vano Muradeli (– 14 August 1970), was a Soviet Georgian composer.

He was born in Gori, Georgia (then part of Imperial Russia) to Georgian -Armenian parents. He graduated from Tbilisi State Conservatory in 1931; then studied with Nikolai Myaskovsky at the Moscow Conservatory. From 1934 to 1938, he worked there. From 1942 to 1944, he served as a principal and artistic director of the Central Ensemble of the Soviet Navy. In 1946, he was awarded the Stalin Prize. In 1948, his opera The Great Friendship was censured by the resolution of the Communist Party Central Committee. After Joseph Stalin's death, he was restored to favor and granted the title of the People's Artist of the USSR in 1968.

Works
Opera: 
"The Great Friendship" (1947; premiere, Moscow, 7 November 1947)
"October" (1950; revised 1962; premiere, Moscow, 22 April 1964)

Operetta: 
"Moscow-Paris-Moscow" (1968)

Orchestra:
Symphony No. 1 "To the Memory of Kirov" (1938; premiere Moscow, 28 November 1938)
Symphony No. 2 (1945; received Stalin Prize)
Georgian Dance Suite for symphony orchestra (1939)
Festive Overture for symphony orchestra (1940)
Symphonic poem, "The Path of Victory" for chorus and orchestra (1950)

Vocal with orchestra: 
Cantata: "Our Leader" (for the 60th birthday of Stalin, 1939)
Cantata: "Together for Ever" (1959)
Cantata: "Lenin is Among Us" (1960)
Song on the Youth of Stalin for solo-voice and orchestra (1940)
"Zdravitza" for mixed chorus and orchestra (1941)
March for mixed chorus and wind orchestra (1941)

References

External links
Page on van Rijen site Contains a worklist

1908 births
1970 deaths
20th-century classical composers
20th-century male musicians
Burials at Novodevichy Cemetery
Classical composers from Georgia (country)
Georgian people of Armenian descent
Male film score composers
Male opera composers
Opera composers from Georgia (country)
People from Gori, Georgia
People from Tiflis Governorate
People's Artists of the USSR
Soviet classical composers
Soviet film score composers
Soviet male classical composers
Soviet opera composers
Stalin Prize winners
Soviet Armenians